Thiaminase is an enzyme that metabolizes or breaks down thiamine into two molecular parts. It is an antinutrient when consumed.

The old name was "aneurinase".

There are two types:
 Thiamine pyridinylase, Thiaminase I
 Aminopyrimidine aminohydrolase, Thinaminase II

Sources
Source include: 
 Bracken (brake), nardoo, horsetail, and other plants.
 Some fish including carp and goldfish.
 A few strains of bacteria such as Paenibacillus thiaminolyticus (Bacillus thiaminolyticus), Bacillus aneurinolyticus, or Bacillus subtilis.
 An African silk worm, Anaphe venata

Effects
Its physiological role for  fish, bacterial cell or insect is not known. However, in ferns it is thought to offer protection from insects while studies have shown that thiamine hydrolase (thiaminase type 2) which was originally thought to be involved solely in the degradation of thiamine has actually been identified as having a role in thiamine degradation with the salvage of the pyrimidine moiety where thiamin hydrolysis product N-formyl-4-amino-5-aminomethyl-2-methylpyrimidine is transported into the cell and deformylated by the ylmB-encoded amidohydrolase and hydrolyzed to  5-aminoimidazole ribotide.

It was first described in 1941 as the cause of highly mortal ataxic neuropathy in fur-producing foxes eating raw entrails of river fish like carp.

It is also known as the cause of cerebrocortical necrosis of cattle and polioencephalomalasia of sheep eating thiaminase containing plants.

It was once causing economical losses in raising fisheries, e.g. in yellowtail fed raw anchovy as a sole feed for a certain period, and also in sea bream and rainbow trout. The same problem is being studied in a natural food chain system.

The larvae of a wild silk worm Anaphe venata are being consumed in a rain forest district of Nigeria as a supplemental protein nutrition, and the heat-resistant thiaminase in it is causing an acute seasonal cerebellar ataxia named African seasonal ataxia or Nigerian seasonal ataxia.

In 1860–61, Burke and Wills were the first Europeans to cross Australia south to north; on their return they subsisted primarily on raw nardoo-fern. It is possible that this led to their death due to the extremely high levels of thiaminase contained in nardoo. The Aborigines prepared nardoo by soaking the sporocarps in water for at least a day to avoid the effects of thiamine deficiency that would result from ingesting the leaves raw.  In the explorers' journals they noted many symptoms of thiamine deficiency, so it is thought that they did not soak the nardoo long enough.  Eventually thiamine deficiency could have led to their demise.  It is noteworthy to mention that there are several other hypotheses regarding what may have killed Burke and Wills and it is widely disagreed upon by historians and scientists alike.

References

External links 
  
  

EC 2.5.1